Otopheidomenis zalelestes is a species of mite in the family Otopheidomenidae.

References

Mesostigmata
Articles created by Qbugbot